Wayne Kevin Mills CGC is a former British Army soldier. He was the first gazetted recipient of the Conspicuous Gallantry Cross for his actions during active operations in Bosnia in 1994.

While serving with the 1st Battalion The Duke of Wellington's Regiment (West Riding) on United Nations service in Bosnia on 29 April 1994, a patrol led by Corporal Mills came under heavy small-arms fire from a group of Bosnian Serbs. The patrol returned fire, killing two of the attackers. The patrol moved away back towards their base and soon reached an open clearing, where it was obvious they would be highly vulnerable to fire from the attackers. Mills then performed his feat of bravery. Turning around, back into the wood, he engaged the attacking group, delaying them long enough to allow the rest of his patrol to cross the clearing. Mills shot the leader of the group, causing the rest to scatter. He returned to his patrol safely.

External links
 London gazette
 Gallantry Awards
 History of the Duke of Wellingtons Regiment

Duke of Wellington's Regiment soldiers
Living people
Year of birth missing (living people)
Recipients of the Conspicuous Gallantry Cross
NATO personnel in the Bosnian War